Ryoken Kawagishi (born 6 December 1966) is a Japanese professional golfer.

Kawagishi was born in Ishikawa Prefecture.

As an amateur, he won two events in the United States in 1989, the Eastern Amateur and the Monroe Invitational.

Kawagishi joined the Japan Golf Tour in 1990, winning six times in his career. He was the rookie of the year in 1990, winning three times. He won again in 1991, 1995 and 1999.

Amateur wins
1989 Eastern Amateur, Monroe Invitational

Professional wins (6)

Japan Golf Tour wins (6)

*Note: The 1991 Pocari Sweat Open was shortened to 54 holes due to rain.

Japan Golf Tour playoff record (0–2)

Team appearances
Amateur
Eisenhower Trophy (representing Japan): 1986, 1988

Professional
Four Tours World Championship (representing Japan): 1991
Dynasty Cup (representing Japan): 2005

External links

Japanese male golfers
Japan Golf Tour golfers
Sportspeople from Ishikawa Prefecture
1966 births
Living people